This is a list of episodes of Flikken Maastricht.

Series overview

Episodes

Season 1 (2007)

Season 2 (2008)

Season 3 (2009–10)

Season 4 (2010)

Season 5 (2011)

Season 6 (2012)

Season 7 (2013)

Season 8 (2014)

Season 9 (2014)

Season 10 (2015)

References 

Flikken Maastricht
Flikken Maastricht